The 2017 Atlantic hurricane season was an event in the annual tropical cyclone season in the north Atlantic Ocean. This Atlantic hurricane season saw above-normal activity; it was the seventh most active season on record and the most active since 2005. The season officially began on June 1, 2017 and ended on November 30, 2017. These dates, adopted by convention, historically describe the period in each year when most tropical systems form. However, storm formation is possible at any time of the year, as demonstrated in 2017 by the formation of the season's first named storm, Tropical Storm Arlene, on April 19. The final storm of the season, Tropical Storm Rina degenerated to a remnant area of low pressure on November 9.

The 2017 season produced 17 named storms, of which 10 became hurricanes including six of which intensified into major hurricanes (Category 3, 4 or 5). Of those six, Harvey and Irma, became the first major hurricanes to make landfall on the continental United States in 12 years; a third hurricane, Nate, did so as well. September was both the most active month in the season and the most active month for Atlantic hurricanes ever recorded. Four long-lived major hurricanes—Irma, Jose, Lee and Maria—moved through the Atlantic Basin, as did the short-lived Hurricane Katia. Overall, more accumulated cyclone energy was generated during September 2017 than during the entire 2016 season. In April 2018, the World Meteorological Organization retired the names Harvey, Irma, Maria, and Nate from its rotating naming lists due to the number of deaths and amount of damage they caused, and they will not be used again for another Atlantic hurricane.

This timeline documents tropical cyclone formations, strengthening, weakening, landfalls, extratropical transitions, and dissipations during the season. It includes information that was not released throughout the season, meaning that data from post-storm reviews by the National Hurricane Center, such as a storm that was not initially warned upon, has been included.

By convention, meteorologists use one time zone when issuing forecasts and making observations: Coordinated Universal Time (UTC), and also use the 24-hour clock (where 00:00 = midnight UTC). The National Hurricane Center uses both UTC and the time zone where the center of the tropical cyclone is currently located. The time zones utilized (east to west) prior to 2020 were: Atlantic, Eastern, and Central. In this timeline, all information is listed by UTC first with the respective regional time included in parentheses. Additionally, figures for maximum sustained winds and position estimates are rounded to the nearest 5 units (knots, miles, or kilometers), following the convention used in the National Hurricane Center's products. Direct wind observations are rounded to the nearest whole number. Atmospheric pressures are listed to the nearest millibar and nearest hundredth of an inch of mercury.

Timeline

April

April 19
 00:00 UTC (8:00 p.m.

April 20
 00:00 UTC (8:00 p.m.
 06:00 UTC (2:00 a.m.

April 21
 00:00 UTC (8:00 p.m.
 12:00 UTC (8:00 a.m.

May
No tropical cyclones form in the Atlantic Ocean during the month of May.

June

June 1
 The 2017 Atlantic hurricane season officially begins.

June 19
 18:00 UTC (2:00 p.m.

June 20
 02:00 UTC (10:00 p.m.
 09:00 UTC (5:00 a.m.
 18:00 UTC (1:00 p.m.

June 21
 00:00 UTC (7:00 p.m.

June 22
 06:00 UTC (1:00 a.m.
 07:00 UTC (2:00 a.m.

June 23
 00:00 UTC (7:00 p.m.
 18:00 UTC (1:00 p.m.

July

July 5
 18:00 UTC (2:00 p.m.

July 6
 12:00 UTC (8:00 a.m.

July 7
 12:00 UTC (8:00 a.m.

July 17
 06:00 UTC (2:00 a.m.
 12:00 UTC (8:00 a.m.

July 18
 00:00 UTC (8:00 p.m.
 18:00 UTC (2:00 p.m.

July 30
 18:00 UTC (2:00 p.m.

July 31
 00:00 UTC (8:00 p.m.
 14:45 UTC (10:45 a.m.

August

August 1
00:00 UTC (8:00 p.m.

August 2
 00:00 UTC (8:00 p.m.

August 7
 00:00 UTC (8:00 p.m.

August 8
 03:45 UTC (10:45 p.m.

August 9
 00:00 UTC (7:00 p.m.
 18:00 UTC (1:00 p.m.

August 10
 00:00 UTC (7:00 p.m.
 05:00 UTC (12:00 a.m. CDT) at Hurricane Franklin makes landfall near Vega de Alatorre, Veracruz, with sustained winds of near .
 06:00 UTC (1:00 a.m.
 12:00 UTC (7:00 a.m.

August 12
 18::00 UTC (2:00 p.m.

August 13
 00:00 UTC (8:00 p.m.

August 15
 06:00 UTC (2:00 a.m.

August 16
 12:00 UTC (8:00 a.m.
 18:00 UTC (2:00 p.m.

August 17
 06:00 UTC (2:00 a.m.
 06:00 UTC (2:00 a.m.
 12:00 UTC (8:00 a.m.
 18:00 UTC (2:00 p.m.
 18:00 UTC (2:00 p.m.

August 18
 00:00 UTC (8:00 p.m.
 10:00 UTC (6:00 a.m.
 15:00 UTC (11:00 a.m.

August 19
 12:00 UTC (8:00 a.m.
 18:00 UTC (2:00 p.m.

August 23
 12:00 UTC (7:00 a.m.
 18:00 UTC (1:00 p.m.

August 24
 18:00 UTC (1:00 p.m.

August 25
 06:00 UTC (1:00 a.m.
 18:00 UTC (1:00 p.m.

August 26
 00:00 UTC (7:00 p.m.
 03:00 UTC (10:00 p.m.
 06:00 UTC (1:00 a.m. CDT) at Hurricane Harvey weakens to Category 3 intensity as it makes landfall on the northeast end of Copano Bay, near Holiday Beach, Texas.
 12:00 UTC (7:00 a.m.
 18:00 UTC (1:00 p.m.

August 29
 18:00 UTC (1:00 p.m.

August 30
 00:00 UTC (8:00 p.m.
 06:00 UTC (2:00 a.m.
 08:00 UTC (3:00 a.m.

August 31
 00:00 UTC (7:00 p.m.
 06:00 UTC (2:00 a.m.
 18:00 UTC (2:00 p.m.

September

September 1
 00:00 UTC (8:00 p.m.
 06:00 UTC (1:00 a.m. CDT) at Tropical Depression Harvey becomes extratropical over the Tennessee Valley, and subsequently dissipates.

September 2
 12:00 UTC (8:00 a.m.
September 3
 12:00 UTC (8:00 a.m.

September 4
 18:00 UTC (2:00 p.m.

September 5
 06:00 UTC (2:00 a.m.
 12:00 UTC (8:00 a.m.
 12:00 UTC (8:00 a.m.
 12:00 UTC (7:00 a.m.

September 6
 05:45 UTC (1:45 a.m.
 06:00 UTC (2:00 a.m.
 06:00 UTC (1:00 a.m.
 11:15 UTC (7:15 a.m.
 16:30 UTC (12:30 p.m.
 18:00 UTC (2:00 a.m.
 18:00 UTC (1:00 p.m.

September 7
 12:00 UTC (8:00 a.m.
 18:00 UTC (2:00 p.m.

September 8
 05:00 UTC (1:00 a.m.
 06:00 UTC (2:00 a.m.
 12:00 UTC (7:00 a.m.
 18:00 UTC (2:00 p.m.
 18:00 UTC (1:00 p.m.

September 9
 00:00 UTC (8:00 p.m.
 00:00 UTC (7:00 p.m.
 03:00 UTC (11:00 p.m.
 03:00 UTC (10:00 p.m.
 06:00 UTC (2:00 a.m.
 06:00 UTC (1:00 a.m.
 12:00 UTC (8:00 a.m.
 12:00 UTC (7:00 a.m.
 18:00 UTC (2:00 p.m.

September 10
 00:00 UTC (8:00 p.m.
 06:00 UTC (2:00 a.m.
 13:00 UTC (9:00 a.m.
 18:00 UTC (2:00 p.m.
 18:00 UTC (2:00 p.m.
 19:30 UTC (3:30 p.m.

September 11
 00:00 UTC (8:00 p.m.
 06:00 UTC (2:00 a.m.
 12:00 UTC (8:00 a.m.
 18:00 UTC (2:00 p.m.

September 12
 06:00 UTC (2:00 a.m. EDT) at Tropical Storm Irma degenerates into a remnant low over central Alabama, and subsequently dissipates.

September 14
 18:00 UTC (2:00 p.m.

September 15
 00:00 UTC (8:00 p.m.
 18:00 UTC (2:00 p.m.

September 16
 12:00 UTC (8:00 a.m.
 12:00 UTC (8:00 a.m.
 18:00 UTC (2:00 p.m.

September 17
 12:00 UTC (8:00 a.m.
 12:00 UTC (8:00 a.m.
 18:00 UTC (2:00 p.m.

September 18
 12:00 UTC (8:00 a.m.

September 19
 00:00 UTC (8:00 p.m.
 01:15 UTC (9:15 p.m. AST, September 18) at Hurricane Maria makes landfall in Dominica with maximum winds near .
 06:00 UTC (2:00 a.m.
 12:00 UTC (8:00 a.m.
 12:00 UTC (8:00 a.m.
 18:00 UTC (2:00 p.m.

September 20
 03:00 UTC (11:00 p.m.
 10:15 UTC (6:15 a.m. AST) at Hurricane Maria weakens to a Category 4 hurricane and makes landfall near Yabucoa, Puerto Rico with maximum winds near .
 12:00 UTC (8:00 a.m.
 18:00 UTC (2:00 p.m.

September 21
 06:00 UTC (2:00 a.m.

September 22
 00:00 UTC (8:00 p.m.
 12:00 UTC (8:00 a.m.
 18:00 UTC (2:00 p.m.

September 23
 00:00 UTC (8:00 p.m.

September 24
 06:00 UTC (2:00 a.m.
 06:00 UTC 2:00 a.m.

September 25
 00:00 UTC (8:00 p.m.
 06:00 UTC (2:00 a.m.
 06:00 UTC (2:00 a.m.

September 26
 06:00 UTC (2:00 a.m.

September 27
 12:00 UTC (8:00 a.m.
 18:00 UTC (2:00 p.m.

September 28
 00:00 UTC (8:00 p.m.
 06:00 UTC (2:00 a.m.
 18:00 UTC (2:00 p.m.

September 29
 18:00 UTC (2:00 p.m.

September 30
 06:00 UTC (2:00 a.m.
 18:00 UTC (2:00 p.m.

October

October 4
 12:00 UTC (8:00 a.m.

October 5
 06:00 UTC (02:00 a.m.
 12:00 UTC (08:00 a.m.

October 7
 06:0 UTC (1:00 a.m.
 18:00 UTC (1:00 p.m.

October 8
 00:00 UTC (7:00 p.m.
 05:20 UTC (12:20 a.m.
 06:00 UTC (1:00 a.m.
 18:00 UTC (1:00 p.m. CDT) at Tropical Storm Nate weakens into a tropical depression over northern Alabama.

October 9
 00:00 UTC (8:00 p.m. EDT, October 8) at Tropical Depression Nate degenerates to a remnant low over central Tennessee.
 06:00 UTC (2:00 a.m. EDT) at The remnants of Nate become extratropical over southern Ohio, and subsequently dissipate.
 06:00 UTC (2:00 a.m.

October 11
 18:00 UTC (2:00 p.m.

October 12
 18:00 UTC (2:00 p.m.

October 13
 00:00 UTC (8:00 p.m.
 12:00 UTC (8:00 a.m.

October 14
 00:00 UTC (8:00 p.m.
 12:00 UTC (8:00 a.m.

October 15
 00:00 UTC (8:00 p.m.
 18:00 UTC (2:00 p.m.

October 16
 00:00 UTC (8:00 p.m.

October 28
 12:00 UTC (8:00 a.m.
 18:00 UTC (2:00 p.m.
 22:00 UTC (6:00 p.m.

October 29
 00:00 UTC (8:00 p.m. EDT October 28) at Tropical Storm Philippe weakens to a tropical depression inland over west-central Cuba, and later dissipates.

November

November 5
 18:00 UTC (2:00 p.m.

November 7
 00:00 UTC (8:00 p.m.

November 8
 06:00 UTC (2:00 a.m.

November 9
 00:00 UTC (8:00 p.m.
 06:00 UTC (2:00 a.m.

November 30
The 2017 Atlantic hurricane season officially ends.

See also

Lists of Atlantic hurricanes
Timeline of the 2017 Pacific hurricane season

Notes

References

External links

  2017 Tropical Cyclone Advisory Archive, National Hurricane Center and Central Pacific Hurricane Center
 Hurricanes and Tropical Storms – Annual 2017, National Centers for Environmental Information

2017 Atlantic hurricane season
2017
Articles which contain graphical timelines
2017 Atl T